The Stigmatines officially named the Congregation of the Sacred Stigmata  is a Catholic clerical religious congregation of Pontifical Right for men (Priests and Brothers). The Stigmatine Congregation was founded on November 4, 1816 by Gaspar Bertoni, in Verona, Italy.  Its members use the post-nominals C.S.S..

History 

The first written constitutions for the congregation were based on the constitutions of the Society of Jesus, a religious order founded by Ignatius of Loyola. Like the Jesuits, the congregation was intended as a missionary and educational ministry. The church where the Stigmatines were founded in Verona, Italy, was dedicated to the Stigmata of St. Francis of Assisi, from which the original title of the Community came. The patrons of the Stigmatine Congregation are the Holy Spouses, Mary and Joseph. The community's patronal feast is January 23, the  Espousals of Mary and Joseph.

The growth of the community was slow. In 1905, the Stigmatines went to the United States in 1907, and in 1910, they started activities in Brazil. For nearly two centuries, the Stigmatines worked in China, Thailand, the Philippines and various countries in Africa and Latin America.

In 2002, the Stigmatines settled in India.

In June 2018, the city council of Waltham, Massachusetts, voted to take the 46 acres owned by the Stigmatines by eminent domain, for the purpose of building a new high school. The site includes the Espousal Retreat Center, a conference center, and a retirement home for priests. Mayor Jeannette McCarthy stated that the property is valued at $25.4 million; the city is offering $18 million.  A statement on the Stigmatines' website states, "No one is doubting or discounting the need for a new high school in Waltham. We just don't believe the City should be able to end our existence here in Waltham because it covets our land for its own use." In December 2019, the parties resolved their dispute by the city council agreeing to pay a total of $29 million for the site.

In the Philippines, on 8 September 2021, Jessie Avenido (30 years old), Jestonie Avenido (29 years old) and Jerson Rey Avenido (28 years old), three brothers, members of the congregation, were ordained priests by archbishop Jose Cabantan in the Cathedral of Cagayan de Oro.

Statistics 
In 2012, they had 94 houses with 422 members, including 331 priests.

Stigmatine Apostolates
 the instruction of the Youth 
 the preaching of retreats and popular missions 
 the assistance in clergy formation

Fathers General 
 Peter Vignola
 Very Rev. John B. Tomasi
 Andrea Meschi (2000—present)

References

External links 
 Congregation of the Sacred Stigmata
 Community Stimmatini de Sezano
 Congregation of Sacred Stigmata Sta. Cruz
 GigaCatholic 

Religious organizations established in 1816
Catholic orders and societies
Catholic missionary orders
1816 establishments in Italy
1816 establishments in the Austrian Empire